Buj in Iran, may refer to:
 Buj, Kerman
 Buj, South Khorasan